Alexander Lewis is an English-Australian operatic tenor and musical theatre actor who has performed in Australia, the UK, the US, and Germany. He sang in the world premiere of Matthew Aucoin's opera Crossing.

Early life
Lewis spent the early years of his life in Hampstead, London, initially observing his opera-singer parents before eventually joining the St Albans Cathedral Choir at the age of seven. Lewis comes from a musical family. His father, the baritone Michael Lewis, is an opera singer and concert performer and his mother Patricia Price is a mezzo-soprano from Wales and the retired Head of Vocal Studies and Opera at the Western Australian Academy of Performing Arts. His older brother, Ben Lewis, is known for his portrayal of The Phantom in Andrew Lloyd Webber’s Love Never Dies.

Lewis's parents used their industry contacts to fund-raise for Warrawee Primary School in Sydney where both Alexander and Ben attended. Richard Bonynge was generally the conductor and the performers were whoever was available at the time from the Australian Opera. The concerts continue to this day and a prize named after Lewis's parents is awarded to one of the school's music students.

Career
After the family moved back to Australia, Lewis attended Newington College in Sydney where he studied music and drama whilst playing sport. After high school, Lewis successfully applied to study at the Western Australian Academy of Performing Arts (WAAPA) with brother Ben. Both graduated from the Music Theatre course in 2004. and Alexander was awarded the Lesley Anderson Fellowship as most outstanding student of that year.

In 2001, Lewis was a finalist in the Australian Singing Competition's Mathy Awards and appeared in the Sydney Festival with the Australian Theatre for Young People. In 2002, he featured in the Prime Minister's Australia Day celebrations.

In 2006, Lewis was the winner of Opera Foundation Australia's New York Study Award and spent six weeks studying in New York City, attending rehearsals and performances. At the end of the six-week period, Lewis was given the opportunity to perform for members of the Metropolitan Opera audition panel. In 2007 Lewis was a finalist in the competition Neue Stimmen in Germany

In the 2008 Australian production of Andrew Lloyd Webber's The Phantom of the Opera saw Lewis cast as Raoul opposite Ana Marina and Anthony Warlow. Eventually Lewis was cast as understudy Phantom and so covered the role in Warlow's absences from late 2008 to 2009. Lewis won the Australian National Aria Competition in 2009 and followed that up with second place in the McDonald's Aria Competition and then first place in the 2010 Sir Robert Askin Fellowship.

Based in New York, and in his second year of the Lindemann Young Artist Development Program, Lewis performed in the 2011/2012 and 2012/2013 Metropolitan Opera seasons. Lewis has played numerous stage roles such as Anthony Hope in Sweeney Todd, Nemorino in L'elisir d'amore, Frederick Barrett in the musical Titanic and Vašek in The Bartered Bride in a joint production of the Metropolitan Opera and the Juilliard School conducted by James Levine.

He sang Count Danilo in Opera Australia's production of The Merry Widow opposite Danielle de Niese in 2017/2018 in Melbourne and Sydney. In 2019, Lewis performed as Tony in Francesca Zambello's production of West Side Story for Opera Australia's Handa Opera on the Harbour.

Away from the stage, Lewis has appeared on Australian television in the series headLand and has featured in fund raising events for charities such as the Royal Flying Doctor Service and the Royal Institute for Deaf and Blind Children.

Awards

Lewis is the winner of numerous awards including the Opera Foundation Australia New York Study Award in 2006, the Australian National Aria Competition in 2009, and the Sir Robert Askin Fellowship in 2010.

References

External links
"Tenor Alexander Lewis talks Tamino", Limelight magazine

Year of birth missing (living people)
Living people
People from Hampstead
People educated at Newington College
Edith Cowan University alumni
Australian male musical theatre actors
Australian operatic tenors
Singers from London
21st-century Australian male opera singers
21st-century British male opera singers